Kazys Grinius (17 December 18664 June 1950) was the third President of Lithuania, and held that office from 7 June 1926 to 17 December 1926. Previously, he had served as the fifth Prime Minister of Lithuania, from 19 June 1920 until his resignation on 18 January 1922. He was posthumously awarded with the Lithuanian Life Saving Cross for saving people during the Holocaust and was recognised as a Righteous Among the Nations in 2016.

Early life
Grinius was born in Selema, near Marijampolė, in the Augustów Governorate of Congress Poland, which was part of the Russian Empire.

He studied medicine at the University of Moscow and became a physician. As a young man, he became involved in Lithuanian political activities, and was persecuted by the Tsarist authorities. In 1896, he was one of the founders of the Lithuanian Democratic Party (LDP) and Lithuanian Popular Peasants' Union (LVLS) party.

That same year he married Joana Pavalkytė. For some time they lived in Virbalis. In 1899, their son Kazys was born, and in 1902, their daughter Gražina was born. During World War I they lived in Kislovodsk. In 1918, during a Red Army attack his wife and daughter were killed. They were buried in Kislovodsk cemetery.

Career

When Lithuania regained its independence in 1918, Grinius became a member of the Constituent Assembly as a member of the Lithuanian Popular Peasants' Union party. He served as Prime Minister from 1920 until 1922, and signed a treaty with the Soviet Union.

He was elected president by the Third Seimas, but served for only six months, as he was deposed in a coup led by Antanas Smetona, under the pretext that there was an imminent communist plot to take over Lithuania.

When Nazi Germany invaded Lithuania in 1941, Grinius refused to collaborate with the Germans because of his opposition to the occupation of Lithuania by any foreign power. He fled to the West, when the Soviet army reoccupied Lithuania in 1944, and emigrated to the United States in 1947.

He died in Chicago, Illinois in 1950. After Lithuania regained its independence in 1990, his remains were returned and buried there.

See also
 List of rulers of Lithuania

References

External links
 Information about Kazys Grinius
 DEMOKRATIJOS KELIU: Kaziui Griniui – 150 (PDF) 

1866 births
1950 deaths
Lithuanian emigrants to the United States
Lithuanian physicians
Lithuanian socialists
People from Kazlų Rūda Municipality
Presidents of Lithuania
Prime Ministers of Lithuania
Imperial Moscow University alumni
Lithuanian Righteous Among the Nations